Mibi, MIBI, or variation, may refer to:

 methoxyisobutylisonitrile (MIBI), a chemical used in nuclear medicine
 Multiplexed ion beam imaging (MIBI), a type of mass spectrometry imaging
 Men in Black: International (2019 film) "Men in Black 4" aka MiB:I or MiBi

See also

 
 
 
 Men in Black (1997 film) aka MIB1
 MIB1